U.S. Route 431 (US 431), internally designated by the Alabama Department of Transportation (ALDOT) as State Route 1 (SR 1), is a major north–south state highway across the eastern part of the U.S. state of Alabama. Although US 431's south end is in Dothan, SR 1 continues south for about  along US 231 to the Florida state line.

Route description

SR 1 is primarily the unsigned partner route assigned to US 431.The two routes run concurrently from the southern terminus of US 431 at Dothan to the Tennessee state line. South of Dothan, SR 1 is assigned to US 231.

US 231 enters Alabama in Meridianville with US 431. The two routes continue south until it becomes Memorial Parkway. This route is a freeway with Texas U-turns and frontage roads. It junctions with US 72 east. It continues south for about  until it junctions with US 72 west. Immediately after this concurrency terminus, I-565 is featured in another junction as downtown Huntsville rises into view to the east. After a parclo with old SR 20/Clinton Avenue, US 431 loses US 231 at its junction with SR 53. It turns onto Governor's Drive and gains unsigned SR 1. It passes by the hub of the Huntsville Hospital system, which runs throughout North Alabama, and begins its journey across Monte Sano mountain. After leaving the mountain range, it has no more major junctions past this point as it loses the Governor's Drive name. It eventually passes into Marshall County.

It continues south and splits into two one-way streets; one for each direction. It junctions with SR 227 and SR 69's termini before losing SR 79 south. It turns almost east-to-west and climbs up Sand Mountain. This grade is so steep that there is a runaway truck ramp northbound. It junctions with SR 205's western terminus and enters Albertville. It junctions with SR 75 and leaves the city, entering Boaz and junctioning with SR 205 and SR 179. It then enters Etowah County at Sardis City.

It descends into Ridgeville and junctions with SR 77 and almost immediately junctions with US 278 west. These junctions are immediately beside a railroad track. US 278 and US 431 travel concurrently to Attalla. They maintain a short concurrency with US 11. US 278 and US 431 leave US 11 and cross under a notable railroad bridge, known for its low clearance. The routes then junction with Interstate 59 (I-59). They immediately enter into Gadsden and junction with SR 211. US 431 and US 278 junction with US 411 and cross a bridge over the Coosa River. The routes junction with George Wallace Drive, which leads to I-759. US 278 leaves US 431 and continues east to Hokes Bluff. US 431 enters Glencoe and crosses into Calhoun County.

The route enters into Wellington and junctions with SR 204. The route then climbs and descends multiple hills as it enters into Alexandria, where it junctions with SR 144. It eventually climbs up a steep hill and gives drivers a great view of Anniston, Cheaha State Park, and some of the highest mountains in Alabama as it descends a steep grade into Anniston. It junctions with SR 21 at another parclo interchange and turns south into Oxford. The route junctions with US 78 and immediately junctions with I-20.

The route enters Cheaha State Park, and passes through the forest, junctioning with SR 281, which climbs up to the crest of Mount Cheaha, the highest mountain in the state. It leaves the forest and enters Hollis Crossroads, junctioning with SR 9. It enters Randolph County.

The route has no major junctions until it enters Wedowee. It junctions with SR 48. It leaves Wedowee as a short four-lane divided highway. It regains its two-laned status and eventually enters Roanoke. Here, it junctions with SR 22. It then enters Chambers County.

The route passes through Five Points before crossing into La Fayette. Here, SR 77 returns to the scene as SR 50 has its junction in south La Fayette. In Oak Bowery, US 431 junctions with SR 147. It enters Lee County for about a mile before crossing back into Chambers County. It cuts a corner of Lee County before re-entering into Chambers County for under a mile. It finally enters into Lee County completely, not cutting another corner.

It passes through eastern Opelika before reaching a turn and immediately junctioning with I-85, US 29, and US 280. It gains US 280 and continues along a four-lane divided highway into Russell County.

The two routes run concurrently with US 80 in western Phenix City. It loses US 80 and then leaves US 280 just short of the Georgia line at the Chattahoochee River. In rural Russell County, the route junctions with SR 165. In Seale, it junctions with SR 26. It passes through Pittsview. It then crosses the line into Barbour County.

The route junctions again with SR 165 and crosses a fork of the Chattahoochee River. It enters Eufaula and junctions with US 82 west. Just before the route can cross the river into Georgia, it loses US 82 and moves away from the state line. In rural Barbour County, the route junctions with SR 30, SR 131, and SR 95, also crossing multiple forks of the Chattahoochee River, but not crossing the state line. It crosses the line into Henry County.

It moves farther away from the state line as it enters Abbeville. It junctions with SR 10 and SR 27. It makes the long journey through straight terrain down to Headland. It junctions with SR 134 and leaves the city. It then enters Houston County. The route has entered the Dothan Metropolitan Area.

The route eventually reaches the Ross Clark Circle, which is US 84 at this point. It joins it as it passes through east Dothan. It loses US 84 and continues southwest independently with SR 210, the Ross Clark Circle. It junctions with SR 53 once again as it nears its southern terminus. The beltway turns to the northwest and junctions with US 231 and US 231 Bus. and US 431 Bus., both of which pass through Dothan. SR 1 turns south with US 231, The two business routes end, and US 431 ultimately ends its long journey across east Alabama.

US 431 is a very important route throughout east Alabama, and is traversed by many people alongside US 231 and I-65.

History

Four-lane routing
One of the criticisms of US 431 in its entirety from Kentucky to Alabama was that it was mainly a two-lane road.  ALDOT has prioritized four-laning the route in Alabama as a viable north–south road corridor in the eastern part of the state.

Of particular concern was the segment from Seale south to the Barbour County line, where rolling hills along the original alignment limit the visibility of oncoming traffic, contributing to poor decisions by motorists to pass, resulting in numerous head-on collisions. In this segment alone, 31 people were killed in crashes between 1992 and 2006, leading Reader's Digest to proclaim it one of "America's Deadliest Highways" in 2000. After being contacted by and subsequently meeting the family of a fatal crash victim in 2003, ALDOT Director Joe McInnes decided to expedite the construction on the last remaining stretch of two-lane road between Seale and the Barbour County line.  This  section was completed and opened in late 2010. The old alignment in Russell County is still open to traffic and is now labeled County Route 137.

Traveling south from Tennessee, as of mid-2009, US 431 is a four-lane route to Oxford. Then, after diverting from I-20 east of Oxford at exit 191, it reverts to a two-lane highway southward to Opelika, with a brief four-lane stretch just south of Wedowee. From Opelika southward to its southern terminus in Dothan, US 431 is now open as a four-lane highway.

Anniston Eastern Bypass
Since the early 1990s, bypasses have been planned on both sides of town to alleviate traffic on Quintard Avenue, the main north–south traffic artery in the region. Despite being planned for years, construction did not begin until after receiving funding in a 2009 economic stimulus bill. Prior to the start of construction, archeological work on part of the route that passed through Fort McClellan located Native American spearpoints and an American Civil War homestead.

The bypass runs from I-20 exit 188 (Leon Smith Parkway), following the Golden Springs Road northwards, and cross the Choccolocco Foothills, then crosses over SR 21/McClellan Boulevard. It is complete from McIntosh Road to where the former alignment of US 431 merged with SR 21 which was resconstructed. The northern portion, which began construction in 2010, is built with two at-grade intersections (McClellan Bypass and Summerall Road) and one trumpet interchange (SR 21/McClellan Boulevard). Much development has been the result of this highway in the past decade along I-20 in Oxford and it is regarded as a way to redevelop McClellan as well as north Anniston.

The total cost of the project was $164 million; the final stretch of the road to be constructed is complete as of December 2015, and work on the US 431 tie-in continued into 2016 before completion. US 431 follows this route from I-20 northward.

Major intersections

See also

References

External links

 

31-4
Transportation in Madison County, Alabama
Transportation in Marshall County, Alabama
Transportation in Etowah County, Alabama
Transportation in Calhoun County, Alabama
Transportation in Cleburne County, Alabama
Transportation in Randolph County, Alabama
Transportation in Chambers County, Alabama
Transportation in Lee County, Alabama
Transportation in Russell County, Alabama
Transportation in Barbour County, Alabama
Transportation in Henry County, Alabama
Transportation in Houston County, Alabama
 Alabama